Keysher Fuller Spence (born 12 July 1994) is a Costa Rican professional footballer who plays as a right-back for Liga FPD Club Sport Herediano and the Costa Rica national team.

Fuller made his debut for the senior Costa Rica national team at Avaya Stadium on 2 February 2019 against the United States.

Club career
From Limón, Fuller was in the Deportivo Saprissa youth academy. Fuller made his debut in the Second Division reserve team in January 2012. In 2016 he went to C.S. Uruguay de Coronado and a season later to Municipal Grecia where he become one a first team regular during the 2017-18 season. His form for Municipal Grecia led to C.S. Herediano acquiring his services in March 2018. In his first season with Herediano he won the CONCACAF League.

International career
Born in Costa Rica, Fuller is of Jamaican descent. He made his senior debut for Costa Rica in a friendly against the United States on February 2, 2019. The next month on March 27 he scored his first international goal in a 1-0 win over Jamaica. Fuller also represented Costa Rica at the 2021 CONCACAF Gold Cup.

In November 2022, Fuller was named to the Costa Rican squad for the 2022 FIFA World Cup. In Costa Rica's second group stage match on November 27, he scored the only goal of the game in a 1-0 victory over Japan.

International goals

Honours
Herediano
Liga FPD: Apertura 2018, Apertura 2019
CONCACAF League: 2018

References

External links
 

1994 births
Living people
Costa Rican footballers
Costa Rica international footballers
Costa Rican people of Jamaican descent
People from Limón Province
Association football defenders
C.S. Uruguay de Coronado players
Municipal Grecia players
C.S. Herediano footballers
Liga FPD players
2019 CONCACAF Gold Cup players
2021 CONCACAF Gold Cup players
2022 FIFA World Cup players